James Hubbard (December 7, 1906 – May 21, 1960) was an American rower. He competed in the men's coxed four event at the 1928 Summer Olympics.  He graduated from Harvard University and Union Theological Seminary.

References

1906 births
1960 deaths
American male rowers
Olympic rowers of the United States
Rowers at the 1928 Summer Olympics
Sportspeople from Pennsylvania
Harvard Crimson rowers
Union Theological Seminary (New York City) alumni